The Town of Mountain View is a home rule municipality located in Jefferson County, Colorado, United States. Mountain View is situated west of, and adjacent to, the city and county of Denver. As of the 2010 census, the population of Mountain View was 507. The Denver Post Office (ZIP Code 80212) serves Mountain View.

History 
Mountain View was incorporated in 1904 on the land occupied by the Berkeley Annex subdivision established in 1888, which itself was part of the Berkeley Farm founded by John Brisben Walker in 1879.

The town grew to approximately 500 residents living in 272 houses by 2008, with approximately 20 businesses in operation, but occupying a total of only 12 square blocks "sandwiched between Wheat Ridge and Denver."

By 2009, several businesses had closed down, sales taxes declined, and city workers were paid late on three occasions over two months.  The town council added a  fee to sewer bills in order to maintain basic services. The Colorado state government stepped in to pay for getting the city's financial records in order. The town wrote a letter to its residents saying, "'Our town is in serious trouble and we need your help!' [offering] three options: Get some more businesses into town, unincorporate and be absorbed into Jefferson County or let a neighboring community annex the town."

Geography 

Mountain View is located on the eastern edge of Jefferson County at  (39.775692, −105.056122). It is bordered to the north by Lakeside, to the west and south by Wheat Ridge, and to the east by Denver.

Demographics 

As of the census of 2000, there were 569 people, 272 households, and 130 families residing in the town. The racial makeup of the town was 52.4% White, 8.6% African American, 1.5% Native American, 0.3% Asian, 0.3% Pacific Islander, 3.87% from other races, and 1.93% from two or more races. Hispanic or Latino of any race were 36.7% of the population.

There were 572 households, out of which 23.9% had children under the age of 18 living with them, 30.5% were married couples living together, 11.0% had a female householder with no husband present, and 52.2% were non-families. 41.5% of all households were made up of individuals, and 13.6% had someone living alone who was 65 years of age or older. The average household size was 2.09 and the average family size was 2.91.

In the town, the population was spread out, with 20.2% under the age of 18, 7.6% from 18 to 24, 34.1% from 25 to 44, 24.1% from 45 to 64, and 14.1% who were 65 years of age or older. The median age was 38 years. For every 100 females, there were 96.9 males. For every 100 females age 18 and over, there were 94.8 males.

The median income for a household in the town was $41,364, and the median income for a family was $42,250. Males had a median income of $32,917 versus $27,063 for females. The per capita income for the town was $21,425. About 12.2% of families and 13.0% of the population were below the poverty line, including 31.8% of those under age 18 and 14.9% of those age 65 or over.

Economy 
With its land area of only 12 square blocks, Mountain View has a tiny retail sales tax base from which to raise revenue and relies primarily on traffic tickets to pay its police and municipal employees.

The town called an emergency meeting on March 2, 2009, to get input on its future. The town sent a letter to all residents stating that it faced a growing debt crisis, with a budget shortfall between six and eight thousand dollars a month. The letter stated that its police officers had been paid late three times in the last two months, 40 percent of the town's businesses had closed, and that it had petitioned the Attorney General of Colorado to use DEA seizure money to pay police department salaries, which was declined in May 2009.

The letter proposed imposing additional fees for police services and even streetlights, noting in its last sentence that being annexed into a neighboring community was one possible outcome of the fiscal crisis.

Police department controversies 

The Mountain View Police Department has been criticized for its overuse of issuing citations for menial traffic violations. Officers have frequently issued tickets for such violations as cracked windshields or objects such as air fresheners hanging from rearview mirrors. In 2013, the department issued more citations than the cities of Denver, Aurora, and Boulder, combined. Nearly half of the town's revenue comes from court fees and citations, according to its 2014 budget. A typical "obstructed view" citation alone can run someone $80, which includes a $30 surcharge. It is alleged that the excessive enforcement of these laws is motivated to raise revenues for the police department, a force with only nine full-time or part-time officers.

In 2014, the Mountain View Police Department was mentioned in a "Best of the Worst" piece on Reason TV, pointing out that Mountain View police fund their own jobs in part by over-ticketing out-of-town motorists for obstructed view citations.

Mountain View PD was again featured in a 2015 interview with 9NEWS KUSA reporter Jeremy Jojola following an investigation by 9NEWS of all 270 Colorado municipalities with respect to budgets and police ticketing of motorists. In 2014, Mountain View brought in 53 percent of total town revenue from police tickets. Mountain View issues tickets for the primary enforcement of a seat-belt violations in addition to the "obstructed view" violations previously mentioned.

See also 

Outline of Colorado
Index of Colorado-related articles
State of Colorado
Colorado cities and towns
Colorado municipalities
Colorado counties
Jefferson County, Colorado
Jefferson County R-1 School District
List of statistical areas in Colorado
Front Range Urban Corridor
North Central Colorado Urban Area
Denver-Aurora-Boulder, CO Combined Statistical Area
Denver-Aurora-Broomfield, CO Metropolitan Statistical Area

References

External links 
Town of Mountain View official website
CDOT map of Mountain View

Towns in Jefferson County, Colorado
Towns in Colorado
Denver metropolitan area